Euschistospiza is a genus of birds in the family Estrildidae, found in Sub-Saharan Africa.

Species
It contains two species:

External links